The 2014–15 Mercer Bears men's basketball team represented Mercer University during the 2014–15 NCAA Division I men's basketball season. The Bears, led by seventh year head coach Bob Hoffman, played their home games at Hawkins Arena on the university's Macon, Georgia campus and were first year members of the Southern Conference. They finished the season 19–16, 12–6 in SoCon play to finish in third place. They advanced to the semifinals of the SoCon tournament where they lost to Furman. They were invited to the College Basketball Invitational where they defeated Stony Brook in the first round before losing in the quarterfinals to Louisiana–Monroe.

Roster

Schedule

 
|-
!colspan=9 style="background:#E87511; color:#000000;"| Regular season

|-
!colspan=9 style="background:#E87511; color:#000000;"| SoCon tournament

|-
!colspan=9 style="background:#E87511; color:#000000;"| College Basketball Invitational

References

Mercer Bears men's basketball seasons
Mercer
Mercer
Mercer Bears
Mercer Bears